Broadway Tower may refer to:

 Broadway Tower (Enid, Oklahoma), a registered historic building in the United States
 Broadway Tower (Portland, Oregon)
 Broadway Tower (San Antonio), a building in Texas, United States
 Broadway Tower, Worcestershire, a folly tower in the United Kingdom